Isaac Nii Djanmah Vanderpuye is a Ghanaian politician and the deputy Greater Accra Regional Minister of Ghana from 2013 to 2017

References

Living people
National Democratic Congress (Ghana) politicians
Year of birth missing (living people)
Vanderpuije family of Ghana
Ga-Adangbe people
People from Accra
Ghanaian people of Dutch descent